Cheryl Shuman is the founder of the Beverly Hills Cannabis Club.

Early life
Shuman was born in Buena Vista, Ohio, and raised in Portsmouth, Ohio.

Cannabis
Shuman has used cannabis since 1996, when she founded the Beverly Hills Cannabis Club. In 2015, LA Weekly referred to her as the "Martha Stewart of Marijuana" and The New York Times Theodore Ross called her the "Cannabis Queen of Beverly Hills".

See also
 Cannabis in California

References

External links
 

Living people
American cannabis activists
American Jews
Businesspeople in the cannabis industry
Cannabis in California
People from Beverly Hills, California
People from Portsmouth, Ohio
Year of birth missing (living people)